Incredible Universe was the name of a chain of American consumer electronics stores in the early to mid-1990s.

The operation was conceived by former Tandy CEO John Roach. Many internal corporate philosophies of Disney theme parks were borrowed; in an Incredible Universe store, retail departments were "scenes", employees were "castmembers", customers were "guests", uniforms were "costumes", and so forth. The company was a joint venture between Tandy Corporation and Trans World Entertainment.

Layout
The stores featured a large rotunda area with an actual stage where sales presentations, product demonstrations, autograph signings, or even occasional musical acts were performed, and various retail departments (software, music and video, and accessories) were accessible from this rotunda.  Moving through the rotunda area would lead one to the main storefront where larger consumer electronics and computers were sold.

A store would also generally contain from four to eight sound rooms where particular combinations of audio/video equipment could be demonstrated, and some stores contained McDonald's restaurants (the Wilsonville, Oregon store contained a Pizza Hut) and temporary day care facilities where parents could leave their small children while they shopped.

Many stores also had a second floor which housed a cafeteria for the staff as well as training and demo rooms. The training rooms were used for demonstrating new product from vendors to the staff as well as public training on computers, software, and audio/video gear for purchase. Rounding out the computer department was a computer upgrade center which could add new memory, a sound card, or a modem in just a few minutes.

History
Initially, two stores were opened in Arlington, Texas, and Wilsonville, Oregon. When these proved profitable, parent company Tandy, an electronics company, decided to expand quickly, opening an additional 15 stores. In the mid-1990s, Incredible Universe was a sponsor of the Dallas Mavericks, Dallas Sidekicks, Dallas Stars, Sacramento Kings, and Texas Rangers professional sports franchises. During this time, however, with the growth of other retail outlets such as Best Buy, the market became more competitive, and the expense of operating such large facilities resulted in an overall lack of profitability for the entire enterprise.

Ultimately, the company was forced to close or sell all 17 of its locations between 1996 and 1997. Only six were ever consistently profitable; these six stores (Arlington, Dallas, Phoenix, Wilsonville, Sacramento, San Diego) were sold to California company Fry's Electronics in 1996, which itself ceased operations in 2021.

The closed buildings were so large that they could not be readily adapted to other business purposes, and buyers were so scarce that Tandy sold the empty buildings for mere pennies on the dollar. In 1996, the Incredible Universe stores lost $90 million, and in 1997, Tandy announced the store closures. Tandy officials say "the stores were profitable but not 'viable.'" One of the former Incredible Universe sites located in Houston was acquired and redeveloped by Houston Community College which became the HCC West Loop campus. Another, in Woodbridge, Virginia, became a manufacturing plant for General Dynamics' line of amphibious war fighting vehicles, from 2002 to 2012; it was later adapted to Gander Mtn. and Floor & Decor stores, before becoming vacant, which it remains to this day. The Westbury, Long Island store was converted into a Target and no longer has the 'signature' look (bowed front) of an Incredible Universe. The Sandy, Utah store was converted to a Costco warehouse. The Auburn, Washington location, situated on the north side of the Supermall of the Great Northwest, was converted to a Sam's Club in 1999, retaining the original Incredible Universe façade. The location closed without warning in early 2018; the site is currently unused. The Lone Tree, Colorado store became a Great Indoors, until that chain closed in 2012, at which point it converted to a Sears Outlet, though that eventually closed as well, leaving the property vacant. The Hollywood, Florida location remained empty for some time, but was eventually converted to a Home Depot which it remains to this day. The Columbus, Ohio location was converted into a Garden Ridge (now At Home) while the northern half of the parking lot was used to build a Dave & Buster's. The Pineville, NC store closed abruptly in 1997 after being open for only six months. It was converted to a Sam's Club location, but the front entrance area retained the original two-level overhang.  The Fishers, Indiana store became a car dealership, but was taken over by Fry's in 2005. The Doral, Florida location was converted into another store named "AAAA Universe", which later closed down. The store has since been demolished and a hospital is being built on the site. The Atlanta, Georgia location became a Dave & Buster's location in 1998. After that Dave & Buster's location closed, the building housed a succession of other business; currently the building is being rebuilt into an Amazon warehouse.

References

External links

Former Incredible Universe Employees Reunion website
A case study about the store's real estate assets from retailtrafficmag.com

Defunct retail companies of the United States
Defunct consumer electronics retailers in the United States
Consumer electronics retailers in the United States
Superstores in the United States
RadioShack
Companies based in Arlington, Texas
Retail companies established in 1992
Retail companies disestablished in 1997
Defunct companies based in Texas